The Scodie Mountains are a sub-mountain range of the Southern Sierra Nevada rising from the Mojave Desert, and located in Kern County, California.

Geography
The range lies in an east–west direction directly west of the desert town of Ridgecrest, and southeast of the Kern River Valley and Lake Isabella.

The range was named by the U.S. Forest Service for William Scodie, who established "Scodie's Store" (ca.1860) at the mouth of what is now named Scodie Canyon.

Kiavah Wilderness
The Scodie Mountains are home to the Kiavah Wilderness Area, managed by the Bureau of Land Management.

Natural history
The Scodie Mountains are an ecotone of Mojave Desert and Sierra Nevada flora, with plant communities differentiated by elevation.

They lie to the north of the Jawbone-Butterbredt Area of Critical Environmental Concern.

See also
Robbers Roost (Kern County, California) — NRHP site in the Scodie Mountains.

References

External links
BLM: official Kiavah Wilderness Area website

Mountain ranges of the Sierra Nevada (United States)
Mountain ranges of the Mojave Desert
Mountain ranges of Kern County, California
Kern River Valley
Protected areas of the Mojave Desert
Protected areas of the Sierra Nevada (United States)
Bureau of Land Management areas in California
Mountain ranges of Southern California